WisCon or Wiscon, a Wisconsin science fiction convention, is the oldest, and often called the world's leading, feminist science fiction convention and conference. It was first held in Madison, Wisconsin in February 1977, after a group of fans attending the 1976 34th World Science Fiction Convention in Kansas City was inspired to organize a convention like WorldCon but with feminism as the dominant theme. The convention is held annually in May, during the four-day weekend of Memorial Day. Sponsored by the Society for the Furtherance and Study of Fantasy and Science Fiction, or (SF)³, WisCon gathers together fans, writers, editors, publishers, scholars, and artists to discuss science fiction and fantasy, with emphasis on issues of feminism, gender, race, and class.

Guests of Honor
Since its inception, WisCon has invited one or more guests of honor to attend the convention every year, guiding and participating in programming and giving a speech at a ceremony in their honor. WisCon 30 (May 26–29, 2006) was an anniversary Wiscon, and 39 previous Guests of Honor attended. For WisCon 40, the convention invited a third guest of honor, Nalo Hopkinson, who was previously a guest of honor at WisCon 26. A virtual event happened on Memorial Day weekend in 2020 at WisCon XLIV.
Here are the Guests of honor below:

Offshoot organizations and awards

Multiple awards and organizations have been created through or developed from conversations at WisCon that focus on various issues within science fiction and fantasy. Many of these offshoots still maintain close ties to WisCon, hosting parties or panel discussions focused on their areas of interest.

The James Tiptree, Jr. Award (now the Otherwise Award), an annual literary prize for science fiction or fantasy "that expands or explores our understanding of gender" was first discussed as part of Pat Murphy's Guest of Honor speech at WisCon 15 in 1991. The concept originated in a discussion at a prior WisCon, partly as "...a reaction to the fact that all of the science fiction awards were named after men. So they named the Tiptree for a man who was actually a woman". James Tiptree, Jr., was the pen name of Alice B. Sheldon. The Tiptree Ceremony has been held at other conventions, but is usually held at WisCon.

The Carl Brandon Society was founded in 1999 following discussions at Wiscon 23 about race, racism, and science and fantasy,  inspired in part by Delany’s essay “Racism and Science Fiction” published in the New York Review of Science Fiction (August 1998). The organization is dedicated to addressing the representation of people of color in science fiction, fantasy and horror. In 2005 they created the Parallax Award, given to works of speculative fiction created by a self-identified person of color, and the Kindred Award, which is given to any work of speculative fiction dealing with issues of race and ethnicity; nominees may be of any racial or ethnic group.

Broad Universe, an organization with the primary goal of promoting science fiction, fantasy, and horror written by women, was first discussed at a panel discussion in 2000 at WisCon 24. It has since developed into a nonprofit with an online newsletter and other publications, a podcast, and a frequent presence at many conventions both to sell books written by members and to provide more information and help organize to support women writing, editing, and publishing in science fiction, fantasy, horror, and other speculative fiction.

Books about WisCon
In 2007, Aqueduct Press began issuing a series of books titled "WisCon Chronicles", with The WisCon Chronicles: Vol. 1 , edited by L. Timmel Duchamp. Volume 2 was The WisCon Chronicles: Volume 2: Provocative essays on feminism, race, revolution, and the future , edited by Duchamp and Eileen Gunn; followed by The WisCon Chronicles: Vol. 3: The Carnival of Feminist SF , edited by Liz Henry; The WisCon Chronicles: Vol. 4: Voices of WisCon  edited by Sylvia Kelso; and The WisCon Chronicles: Volume 5: Writing and Racial Identity , edited by Nisi Shawl and released at WisCon 35 (May 27–30, 2011), where Shawl was Guest of Honor. Volume 5, like Volume 4 before it, was supported by a grant from the Society for the Furtherance & Study of Fantasy & Science Fiction [(SF)3]. The WisCon Chronicles 6: Futures of Feminism and Fandom , edited by Alexis Lothian, was issued at WisCon 36 in 2012; and The WisCon Chroncles 7: Shattering Ableist Narratives , edited by JoSelle Vanderhooft, was issued at WisCon 37 in late May 2013.

Helen Merrick's 2009 The Secret Feminist Cabal, a 2010 Hugo nominee, while a broader history of the topic, contains a number of mentions and descriptions of WisCon itself and of various WisCon-spawned projects such as the Tiptree Awards, Broad Universe, and the Carl Brandon Society, beginning with the author's preface and continuing throughout the book.

See also
 Feminist science fiction
 Janus (science fiction magazine)
 The Witch and the Chameleon
 Women in speculative fiction

References

Sources
Bankier, Amanda, "Guest of Honor Speech at Wiscon 1" 
Gomoll, Jeanne, "Guest of Honor Speech at Wiscon 24" 
Gomoll, Jeanne, "An Open Letter to Joanna Russ", in Six Shooter (Jeanne Gomoll, Linda Pickersgill, and Pam Wells, eds.) - reprinted in Fanthology '87 
Hanson, Amy Axt, "How Is Wiscon Different from Other Cons?", The Broadsheet May 2002 
Marks, Laurie J., "Why, and How a Wallflower Throws a Party at Wiscon", The Broadsheet May 2002 
McClenahan, Catherine. "Wiscon, Then and Now." Wiscon 20 Souvenir Book, Madison: SF3, 1996; pp. 46–48.
Morgan, Cheryl, "Down Among the Rad Fems, 1998", The Broadsheet May 2002 
Merrick, Helen. "From Female Man to Feminist Fan: Uncovering 'Herstory' in the Annals of SF Fandom," in Women of Other Worlds: Excursions through Science Fiction and Feminism, edited by Helen Merrick and Tess Williams; Nedlands: University of Western Australia Press, 1999; pp. 115–139.
Wiedenhoeft, John. "Klingons Not Focus of Wiscon The Science Fiction Convention Celebrates Literature and Feminism", The Capital Times May 26, 2006

External links

 WisCon website
 (SF)³ website
 James Tiptree, Jr. Award website

Science fiction conventions in the United States
Culture of Madison, Wisconsin
Conventions in Wisconsin
Feminist organizations in the United States
Feminist science fiction
Festivals in Wisconsin
Organizations based in Madison, Wisconsin
Recurring events established in 1977
Science fiction conferences
1977 establishments in Wisconsin
Annual events in Wisconsin
History of women in Wisconsin